This is a list of aviation-related events from 1927:

Events
 The United States Navys  becomes the first aircraft carrier to operate a multi-engine aircraft, the twin-engine Douglas T2D-1.
 The British aircraft carrier  brings Fleet Air Arm of the Royal Air Force Fairey IIID aircraft to support the Shanghai Defence Force against rebel Chinese forces. The aircraft fly as landplanes from the Shanghai racecourse and as seaplanes from the Huangpu River.
 Germanys lead in commercial aviation is such that during the year German airlines fly greater distances with more passengers than the airlines of France, Italy, and the United Kingdom combined.

January
January 1 – Prompted by the increase in air traffic over Europe, a regulation goes into effect in the United Kingdom requiring the installation of wireless telegraphy equipment aboard any aircraft capable of carrying 10 or more people including crew and that such aircraft carry a special operator for the equipment. The use of radio telephony is limited to aircraft carrying five to nine people including crew.
January 7 – Imperial Airways commences a regular service from Basra to Cairo via Baghdad, the first of its Empire "trunk routes."
January 15 – Boeing Air Transport is formed, to carry airmail between Chicago and San Francisco. It eventually will become United Airlines.

February
February 13 – Regia Aeronautica (Italian Royal Air Force) pilots Francesco de Pinedo and Capitano Carlo Del Prete, accompanied by their mechanic Sergente Vitale Zacchetti, take off from Cagliari, Sardinia, in the Savoia-Marchetti S.55 flying boat Santa Maria to begin their "Four Continents" flight, during which the plan to fly to Africa, cross the South Atlantic to Brazil, make several stops in South America and the Caribbean, visit the United States and Canada, and cross the North Atlantic to recreate the 1919 transatlantic flight of the United States Navy Curtiss NC-4 flying boat before returning to Italy.
February 16 – After stops at Villa Cisneros in Spanish Sahara and Bolama in Portuguese Guinea, Pinedo, Del Prete, and Zacchetti attempt to take off from Bolama to cross the Atlantic Ocean to Brazil. Sweltering conditions prevent their plane from becoming airborne until they dump a large quantity of gasoline, forcing them to fly to the Cape Verde Islands instead, where cooler conditions prevail.
February 23 – Pinedo, Del Prete, and Zacchetti cross the Atlantic, flying from the Cape Verde Islands to Fernando de Noronha, where the Brazilian Navy protected cruiser  meets them and tows their flying boat into port. The next day, they fly to Natal, Brazil, to begin the South American phase of their "Four Continents" flight.

March
He passes out from hypoxia in the thin air, regaining consciousness only just in time to drop ballast and slow his fall after the balloon descends on its own.
March 14 – Pan American Airways is formed to carry airmail on the Key West-Havana route. 
March 16 – After stops at various cities in South America including Rio de Janeiro, Brazil, Buenos Aires, Argentina, Montevideo, Uruguay, and Asunción, Paraguay, the Italian aviators Francesco de Pinedo and Carlo Del Prete and their mechanic Vitale Zacchetti continue their "Four Continents" flight by beginning a long leg over the dense jungle of Brazil's Mato Grosso region. At one point, their Savoia-Marchetti S.55 flying boat Santa Maria is towed by a Brazilian river boat for  along the Paraguay River in search of a suitable takeoff area after a refueling stop, and it takes them until March 20 to complete their crossing of the Matto Grosso and land at Manaós, Brazil. It is history's first flight over the Mato Grosso.
March 21 – John Rodgers Airport (the future Honolulu International Airport) is dedicated in Honolulu, Territory of Hawaii.
March 25 – Belgrade International Airport opens in Belgrade in the Kingdom of Yugoslavia.
March 29 – After stops over the previous four days at Georgetown, British Guiana; Pointe-à-Pitre, Guadeloupe; Port-au-Prince, Haiti; and Havana, Cuba, the Savoia-Marchetti S.55 Santa Maria of de Pinedo, Del Prete, and Zacchetti crosses the Gulf of Mexico and arrives at New Orleans, Louisiana, becoming the first foreign airplane ever to fly into the United States.

April
April 1 – Waldemar Roeder achieves a new world distance record for an aircraft with a 2,000-kilogram (4,410-pound) payload, flying  in 7 hours 52 minutes in a Junkers G 24L.
April 4 – Fritz Horn achieves a new world distance record for an aircraft with a 1,000-kilogram (2,205-pound) payload, flying  in 14 hours 23 minutes in a Junkers G 24L.
April 6 – After departing New Orleans, Louisiana, and flying through Louisiana, Texas, New Mexico, and Arizona as part of their "Four Continents" flight, Francesco de Pinedo, Carlo Del Prete, and Vitale Zacchetti stop on Theodore Roosevelt Lake in Arizona to refuel their Savoia-Marchetti S.55 flying boat Santa Maria. An accidental fire breaks out and destroys the plane; its engines sink  to the bottom of the lake and are not recovered until April 19. The three Italians will fly to San Diego, California, as passengers on a United States Navy plane and then travel by train to New York City to meet a new S.55 shipped there by the Italian Fascist government so that they can continue their flight. The new plane will arrive in New York by ship on May 1.
April 16 – The Portuguese Military Aviation seaplane Argos, piloted by Sarmento de Beires and accompanied by Duvalle Portugal (co-pilot), Jorge de Castilho (navigator) and Manuel Gouveia (mechanic), makes the first night aerial crossing of the South Atlantic which was the first complete night-time flight of the Atlantic, taking off from Portuguese Guinea and landing in Brazil, where they arrived after totaling 2,595 kilometers on an 18-hour, 12-minute flight.
April 26 – Attempting a test flight with a full load of gasoline of the Keystone K-47 Pathfinder American Legion (registration NX179), which they plan to use in an American Legion-sponsored attempt to win the Orteig Prize by making the first nonstop transatlantic flight from New York City to Paris, United States Navy Commander Noel Guy Davis and Lieutenant Stanton Hall Wooster crash on takeoff from Langley Field in Hampton Roads, Virginia. Both men are killed.

May
May 1 – Imperial Airways introduces its luxury "Silver Wing" service between London and Paris.
May 2 – 30,000 people are on hand for the arrival in Belgrade of Yugoslavian aeronautical engineer Tadija Sondermajer and pilot Leonid Bajdak as they complete a 14-stage, 11-day,  flight from Paris to Bombay to Belgrade. Departing Paris on 20 April, they have followed the route Paris-Belgrade-Aleppo-Basra-Jask-Karachi-Bombay-Karachi-Jask-Basra-Aleppo-Belgrade. They make the flight to spur interest in investment in the Kingdom of Yugoslavia′s first civilian airline, Aeroput. Investment in Aeroput increases greatly, saving the new airline from abolition due a lack of capital.
May 4 – United States Army Air Corps Captain Hawthorne C. Gray sets an unofficial record for the highest altitude reached by a human being, attaining  in a balloon with an open basket over Belleville, Illinois.
May 5 – The Société Générale des Transports Aériens Farman F.61 cargo aircraft F-ADFN disappears over the Atlantic Ocean during a flight from Saint-Louis Airport in Saint-Louis, Senegal, to Petrolina Airport in Petrolina, Brazil. Its two crew members are never found.
May 7 – Varig is founded. The first airline founded in Brazil, it will begin flight operations in June.
May 8 – At New York City, Francesco de Pinedo, Carlo Del Prete, and Vitale Zacchetti christen their new Savoia-Marchetti S.55 flying boat Santa Maria II, shipped there by the Italian Fascist government to allow them to continue their "Four Continents" flight and identical to the original plane, Santa Maria, which they had flown until it was destroyed in an accidental fire on April 6. Pinedo plans a revised schedule for their North American tour, eliminating all stops west of the Mississippi River.
May 8–9 – Charles Nungesser and François Coli attempt to cross the Atlantic Ocean from Paris to the United States in the Levasseur PL.8 biplane L'Oiseau Blanc (The White Bird), but disappear over the Atlantic.
May 14 – After stops at Boston, Massachusetts; Philadelphia, Pennsylvania; Charleston, South Carolina; Pensacola, Florida; and New Orleans, Louisiana, de Pinedo, Del Prete, and Zacchetti begin a portion of their "Four Continents" flight that takes them north up the Mississippi River into the Midwestern United States.
May 17 – After completing their tour of the United States with a stop at Memphis, Tennessee, a flight over St. Louis, Missouri, and a stop at Chicago, Illinois, de Pinedo, Del Prete, and Zacchetti make their first stop in Canada, at Montreal, after an 11-hour flight from Chicago.
May 20 – The Dominion of Newfoundland Post Office issues history's first postage stamp honoring an individual aviator. It honors Francesco de Pinedo. 
May 20–21
 Flight Lieutenant Roderick Carr sets out for a new flight distance record, attempting to fly from RAF Cranwell in England to India in a modified Hawker Horsley biplane. Forced to ditch in the Persian Gulf, the flight nonetheless achieves a nonstop record  which will be beaten within hours by Lindbergh.
 Charles Lindbergh flies the Ryan monoplane Spirit of St. Louis across the Atlantic nonstop from Roosevelt Field in New York City to Paris–Le Bourget Airport. Lindbergh wins the Orteig Prize for the first nonstop flight from New York to Paris.
May 22–23 – Pinedo, Del Prete, and Zacchetti depart Trepassey Bay in the Dominion of Newfoundland, planning to cross the Atlantic Ocean to the Azores, refuel, and then fly on to Portugal, retracing the transatlantic flight route of the United States Navy Curtiss NC-4 flying boat in 1919, but they run low on fuel due to unfavorable weather. Pinedo is forced to land the Santa Maria II on the ocean and be taken under tow by a Portuguese fishing boat and an Italian steamer for the final  to the Azores, where the plane arrives at Horta on May 30.
May 27 – France's first aircraft carrier, Béarn, is commissioned
May 28 – While flying at  near Reynoldsburg, Ohio, the United States Army Air Service's Keystone XLB-5 bomber prototype suffers a failure of its right engine in which a blade separates from the propeller hub with explosive power, tearing the engine apart and spraying the five-man crew – which includes 2nd Bombardment Group commander Lewis H. Brereton – with shrapnel. The nose gunner is killed, but the other four men aboard parachute to safety. The gasoline-soaked wreckage of the aircraft explodes and burns on the ground.

June

June 5 – The Verein für Raumschiffahrt ("Society for Spaceship Travel") is formed in Germany.
June 6 – Canadian innovator Wallace Turnbull sells the patent for the variable-pitch propeller to Curtiss-Wright in the United States and Bristol in the United Kingdom. It will be successfully flight tested on June 29.
June 15 – U.S. businessman Van Lear Black charters a KLM Fokker F.VIIa for a flight from the Netherlands to Batavia, the first international charter flight.
June 16 – After repairs in the Azores, a flight back to the point in the Atlantic Ocean where they had been taken under tow by a Portuguese fishing boat, and stops in Portugal and Spain, the Regia Aeronautica (Italian Royal Air Force) pilots Francesco de Pinedo and Carlo Del Prete and their mechanic Vitale Zacchetti complete their "Four Continents" flight, landing their Savoia-Marchetti S.55 flying boat Santa Maria II in Ostia's harbor outside Rome. During their 123-day, 29,180-mile (46,989-kilometer) flight, they have visited numerous locations in Africa, South America, the Caribbean, the United States, Canada, and Europe, crossed the Atlantic Ocean twice, made the first flight across Brazil's Matto Grosso region of dense jungle, made the first flight into the United States by a foreign airplane, overcome the loss of their original S.55 Santa Maria in an accidental fire, and retraced the transatlantic flight route of the United States Navy Curtiss NC-4 flying boat in 1919.
June 17 – Yugoslavia's first civilian airline, Aeroput is founded as the flag carrier of the Kingdom of Yugoslavia . It will begin flight operations in February 1928.
June 22 – Varig begins flight operations. Its first flight is a domestic flight in Brazil from Porto Alegre to Rio Grande via Pelotas, using the first aircraft registered in Brazil, a Dornier Do J Wal (registration P-BAAA).
June 23 – Mikhail Gromov makes the first Soviet parachute jump, when he bails out of a Polikarpov I-1 that has entered an unrecoverable spin.
June 28
Wilhelm Zimmermann, flying a Junkers G 24L, achieves a new world speed record for an aircraft with a 1,000-kilogram (2,205-pound) payload, reaching .
The Spanish airline Iberia is incorporated. It will begin flight operations in December.
June 28–29 – U.S. Army Air Corps Lieutenants Lester J. Maitland and Albert F. Hegenberger make the first transpacific flight from North America to the Hawaiian Islands, flying an Atlantic-Fokker C2 transport plane 2,407 statute miles (3,876 km) from Oakland, California, to Wheeler Field, Territory of Hawaii, in 25 hours 50 minutes. They will receive the 1927 Mackay Trophy and the Distinguished Flying Cross for the achievement.
June 29 – July 1 - Richard Evelyn Byrd with crew flies the Fokker F.VIIa/3m America from New York City to France.

July
 Paul Bäumer, the founder of the German firm Bäumer Aero GmbH, is killed testing a new high-performance monoplane.
 July 16
 The Air League Challenge Cup race takes place for the first time since 1924, returning as an annual event. Flown in England, the race includes participants who are not Royal Air Force pilots for the first time. The 116-mile (187-kilometer) course takes competitors from Castle Bromwich to Woodford and back again.
 Ernie Smith and Emory Bronte complete the first civilian non-stop flight from North America to the Hawaiian Islands when their Travel Air monoplane, the City of Oakland, crashes on Molokai after a flight from Oakland, California. They survive the crash.
United States Marine Corps de Havilland DH.4 aircraft strafe guerrilla forces of Augusto César Sandino in support of Marines forces on the ground in Nicaragua. It is an early example of Marine Corps close air support.
 July 17 – U.S. Marine Corps de Havilland DH.4s are used to attack bandits in Nicaragua threatening the garrison at Ocotal.

August
 August 4 – A Junkers G 24 belonging to Severa takes off from Norderney, Germany, bound for the Azores on its way to the Western Hemisphere in a quest to make the first east-to-west crossing of the Atlantic Ocean by a heavier-than-air aircraft. The attempt ends when the G 24 crashes in the Azores.
 August 12 – The Royal Air Force holds a fly-off between four competing flying boat designs, the Supermarine Southampton, Blackburn Iris, Short Singapore, and Saunders-Roe Valkyrie.
 August 16 – The Dole Derby, a California-to-Hawaii race for single-engine airplanes sponsored by James Dole, takes place. Two aircraft arrive safely at Wheeler Field on Oahu, but three other entrants carrying seven persons are missing at sea. The tragedy puts an end to all plans to fly single-engine land aircraft from North America to Hawaii until 1934.
 August 22 – The KLM Fokker F.VIII H-NADU crashes with 11 people on board at Underriver, England, after a structural failure in its tailfin or rudder. One crewmember dies and eight other people are injured.
 August 25 – A gust of wind catches the tail of the U.S. Navy dirigible  while she is moored to the high mast at Naval Air Station Lakehurst at Lakehurst, New Jersey, causing her tail to rise until she is at an 85-degree angle. She returns to the horizontal with little damage, the only airship known to have survived such a maneuver.
 August 26 – Bert Hinkler sets a new non-stop distance record, flying from Croydon, England to Riga, Latvia.
 On 31 August, the St Raphael with Leslie Hamilton, Princess Anne of Löwenstein-Wertheim-Freudenberg, Frederick F. Minchin and Frank Kohler disappeared over the North Atlantic in the vicinity of Newfoundland as they attempted a transatlantic flight in a Fokker F.VIIA.
August 27: Paul Redfern attempts to fly from Georgia to Rio de Janeiro but fails before making it the entire way

September
September 1 – The first commercial aviation flight started off in Concord, CA flying in a Boeing 40-B2 and landing in New York 32 hours later. Two passengers with mail and other cargo were the first coast to coast commercial passenger flight.
September 8 – The Cessna Aircraft Company is established.
September 26 – The 1927 Schneider Trophy race is flown at Venice, Italy.
September 28 – Lieutenant Dick Bently of the South African Air Force arrives in South Africa, completing the first solo flight there from England. He had left London on September 1.
September 29 – Georg Wulf, co-founder of Focke-Wulf, is killed in the crash of the Focke Wulf F 19 Ente ("Duck").
September 30 – Juan de la Cierva makes the first cross-country rotary-wing aircraft flight in the United Kingdom, flying an Avro 611 autogiro from Hamble-le-Rice to Farnborough Airfield for delivery to the Royal Aircraft Establishment.

October
 October 10 – The French aviators Dieudonné Costes and Joseph Le Brix depart Paris as they begin a flight around the world in the Breguet 19 G.R. Nungesser-Coli. They will complete the trip on April 14, 1928.
 October 11 – Ruth Elder and George Haldeman take off from Roosevelt Field, Long Island, New York, in the Stinson Detroiter American Girl to attempt the longest nonstop transatlantic flight in history, bound for Paris – Le Bourget Airport in France. Mechanical problems force them to ditch off the Azores on October 13, and they are rescued by the passing tanker Barendrecht.
 October 14–15 – Dieudonne Costes and Joseph Le Brix make the first non-stop aerial crossing of the South Atlantic Ocean, flying the Breguet 19 G.R. Nungesser-Coli from Saint-Louis, Senegal to Port Natal, Brazil, as a part of their round-the-world trip.
 October 27 – On Navy Day, the United States Navy's Ford XJR-1 drops nine U.S. Navy parachutists over Washington, D.C. 
 October 28 – Pan American Airways launches its first scheduled international air service, a 70-minute flight from Key West, Florida, to Havana, Cuba.

November
November 4
Flying in a balloon with an open basket in an attempt to set an official world altitude record for human flight – his altitude records of March and May having been unofficial – United States Army Air Corps Captain Hawthorne C. Gray dies of hypoxia after his balloon reaches . His body is found in his balloon basket in a tree near Sparta, Tennessee, the next day. His balloon's barograph indicates that the balloon reached between  before descending. No further high-altitude balloon fights in open baskets will be attempted until the United States Air Force begins Project Manhigh in 1955.
November 16 – The United States Navy commissions , its first large aircraft carrier and its first carrier capable of fleet speeds and true combat operations.
November 17 – Sir Alan Cobham sets out from England in a Short Singapore to make an aerial survey of Africa.
November 21 – During an air show at Santa Monica, California, parachutist Jean Wests parachute becomes entangled on the wing of the plane she jumped from. The pilot manages to land the plane safely, dragging West for several hundred feet, but she nonetheless escapes the incident uninjured.

December
December 14
The Spanish airline Iberia begins flight operations.
The U.S. Navy commissions the aircraft carrier .
At the controls of the Spirit of St. Louis (registration N-X-211), Charles Lindbergh arrives in Mexico City after a 27-hour-15-minute nonstop flight from Bolling Field in Washington, D.C. The flight begins Lindbergh's goodwill tour of Latin America, which will continue until February 13, 1928.
December 20 – Letalski center Maribor is established in Maribor; it will be the oldest surviving operating major flying club in the Balkans.
December 23 – Royal Norwegian Navy Lieutenant Oskar Omdal, Frances Wilson Grayson (a niece of former President Woodrow Wilson), Brice Goldsborough, and Frank Koehler disappear during a flight in the Sikorsky S-36 amphibian Dawn from Curtiss Field on Long Island, New York, to Harbour Grace in the Dominion of Newfoundland, probably going down in the Atlantic Ocean off Nova Scotia in a storm; their remains are never found. They had planned to attempt a transatlantic flight from Newfoundland in the Dawn.
December 31 – While undergoing testing in France, the prototype of the Latécoère 23 flying boat spins into the ground on approach to a landing, killing all five people on board, including Groupe Latécoère test pilot Achille Enderlin. No more Latécoère 23 aircraft are built.

First flights
 Abrial A-3 Oricou
 Buhl Airsedan
 Cierva C.9
 Curtis XP-6, prototype of the Curtiss P-6 Hawk
 Focke-Wulf A 17
 Focke-Wulf A 20
 Hamilton H-47, first American all-metal aircraft
 Kawasaki Type 88
 Keystone LB-5
 Latécoère 28
 Nieuport-Delage Ni-D 52
 Piaggio P.6
 Pitcairn PA-4 Fleetwing II
 Pitcairn PA-5 Mailwing
 Polikarpov P-2
 Potez 29
 Ryan Brougham
 Waco 10
 Late 1927 - Latécoère 23

February
 February 27 or 28 - Curtiss XF7C-1, prototype of the Curtiss F7C Seahawk

March
March 2 – Boeing XF3B-1, prototype of the Boeing F3B-1
March 7 – Westland Wapiti
March 12 – Fokker F.VIII
March 14 – Parnall Pike N202
March 26 – Handley Page Hinaidi

April
April 27 - Stinson Detroiter

May
May 4 - Boeing TB
May 12 - Armstrong Whitworth Starling
May 17 - Bristol Bulldog

June
 Eberhart XFG
June 22 – Short S.6 Sturgeon N199
June 24 – Polikarpov U-2, later redesignated Polikarpov Po-2 (NATO reporting name "Mule")

July
Kawanishi K-11
Mitsubishi 1MF9
July 4 - Lockheed Vega
July 14 – Boeing XP-8

August
Macchi M.52

September
September 2 – Focke-Wulf F 19
September 5 – Junkers k37

November
 Curtiss XF8C-1, prototype of the Curtiss F8C Falcon
 Farman F.180
 Westland Wizard 
 November 19 – Fairchild 41 Foursome, prototype of the Fairchild 42 Foursome

December
 Avro 584 Avocet 
 Latécoère 24
 December 12 – Gloster Gambet, prototype of the Nakajima A1N

Entered service
Buhl Airsedan
Levasseur PL.5 with French Naval Aviation aboard the aircraft carrier Béarn
Vought FU-1 with United States Navy Fighter Squadron VF-2B
 Westland Widgeon

March
March 9 – Ford XJR-1 with the United States Navy, first Ford Trimotor in service with the U.S. armed forces

June
June 24 – Fokker F.VIII with KLM

July
July 1 – Boeing 40 with Boeing Air Transport

Retirements
 Curtiss F4C-1 by the United States Navy

References

 
Aviation by year